Polish Polar Station, Hornsund is at Isbjørnhamna in Hornsund, on Spitsbergen in the Norwegian Svalbard archipelago, operated since 1957.

Station
The station was erected in July 1957 by the Polish Academy of Sciences Expedition within the framework of the International Geophysical Year. The expedition was led by Stanislaw Siedlecki, geologist, explorer and climber, a veteran of Polish Arctic expeditions in the 1930s (including the first traverse of West Spitsbergen island). A reconnaissance group searching the area for the future station site had been working in Hornsund in the previous summer, and selected the flat marine terrace in Isbjørnhamna. The research station was constructed during three summer months in 1957.

The station was modernized in 1978, in order to resume a year-round activity. Since then, the Institute of Geophysics, Polish Academy of Sciences has been responsible for organising year-round and seasonal research expeditions to the station.

Location
South Spitsbergen, near the entrance to Hornsund fjord, on its northern shore, at Isbjørnhamna on a flat marine terrace, 10 m above sea level.

Research
Current full-year research:

Meteorology - gathering data for synoptic purposes and to detect climatic changes;
Seismology - monitoring of world earthquakes, measuring the seismicity of the Spitsbergen Archipelago region, and registering tremors linked to the dynamics of the Hans Glacier;
Geomagnetism - registering changes in the XYZ components of the Earth's magnetic field;
Ionospheric sounding to determine the structure of the ionosphere; using riometer measurements to determine the structure and absorption coefficient of the ionosphere;
Glaciology - measurements of glacier dynamics (Hansbreen, Werenskioldbreen), documentation of glacier recession;
Atmospheric electricity - determining the magnitude of the Earth's electric field and recording its vertical component; 
Environmental monitoring - recording of selected climatic features and conducting analyses of chemical buildup of air and water pollution and the isotopic content of the snow cover.

In summers and winters, the station functions as a base for research on geology, geodesics, geomorphology, glaciology, oceanology and biology.

Time capsule
On September 17, 2017, near the station, scientific researchers buried a 60-centimeter stainless steel tube containing samples designed to tell finders as long as half a million years into the future, about the current state of knowledge in such areas as geology, biology, and technology.

Photos

See also
List of research stations in the Arctic

References

External links
 Hornsund Polish Polar Station

Research institutes in Poland
Research stations in Svalbard
Science and technology in Poland